Kim Hyun-joo (also Kim Hyeon-ju, ; born January 2, 1986) is a South Korean former swimmer, who specialized in freestyle events. She won a total of two bronze medals, as a member of the South Korean team, in the 4 × 100 m freestyle relay (3:44.81) and 4 × 200 m freestyle relay (8:19.62) at the 2002 Asian Games in Busan, South Korea.

Kim qualified for two swimming events at the 2004 Summer Olympics by clearing a FINA B-standard entry time of 2:01.50 (200 m freestyle) from the World Championships in Barcelona, Spain. She also teamed up with Ryu Yoon-ji, Sun So-eun, and Shim Min-ji in the 4 × 100 m freestyle relay. Swimming the anchor leg, Kim recorded a split of 55.83, but the South Koreans missed the final by two seconds outside the top 8, in a time of  3:44.84.

In the 200 m freestyle, Kim challenged seven other swimmers on the fourth heat, including top medal favorite Dana Vollmer of the United States. She rounded out the field to last place by a 1.62-second margin behind Slovenia's Sara Isaković in 2:03.33. Kim failed to advance into the semifinals, as she placed twenty-sixth overall in the prelims.

References

1986 births
Living people
Olympic swimmers of South Korea
Swimmers at the 2004 Summer Olympics
Swimmers at the 2002 Asian Games
Asian Games medalists in swimming
South Korean female freestyle swimmers
Asian Games bronze medalists for South Korea
Medalists at the 2002 Asian Games
21st-century South Korean women